is a Japanese professional sumo wrestler from Ishikawa Prefecture. He made his debut in March 2017 and wrestles for Miyagino stable. His highest rank has been maegashira 4. He is shorter and weighs significantly less than the vast majority of sumo wrestlers in the upper ranks, but has learned to use his small stature and size for maximum advantage, becoming known for toppling larger opponents. He has achieved one special prize for Technique.

Early life and sumo background
Yūya Nakamura's father supported the family by working at a newspaper. Nakamura first started practicing sumo at the age of five, due to the influence of his older brother. In primary school he also was goal keeper for a school water polo team. At the area middle school, he was in the sumo club with the future Kagayaki. In his 3rd year, the team that he and future Kagayaki were members of took the team championship in the middle school prefectural tournament. Nakamura went on to Kanazawa Gakuin, a high school in his city. In his third year there he took the gold medal in the 2012 World Junior Sumo Championships in the lightweight division. He continued to Kanazawa Gakuin University and majored in sports medicine. In his first year, he was the champion of the West Japan New Student Athlete Sumo Tournament, and in his second and third years he won the World Amateur Sumo Championship two years in a row. In all, he acquired ten titles. Seriously interested in joining pro sumo, Nakamura was interviewed at a number of stables before graduating, and upon finishing university, he joined Miyagino stable.

Career
Nakamura became an attendant and apprentice to yokozuna Hakuhō. Hakuhō chose the shikona Enhō for him, with "en" meaning fiery and "hō" meaning the Chinese mythological bird Peng, which is also the hō in the yokozuna's own name. He participated in maezumō in the March 2017 tournament alongside future Wakatakakage. In the ceremony to debut new recruits on day 5, he wore the ceremonial apron, or kesho-mawashi, that his mentor Hakuhō was to start using from that day. However, Hakuhō ended up taking injury leave from the tournament on that same day.

Enhō's first pro tournament was the following May, starting at the bottom in the jonokuchi division. He was undefeated at 7–0 and took the championship. After this tournament he changed his second name in his full shikona title from his real name Yūya, to the name Akira. The name Akira honored his mentor at his dojo, named Akira, who died in a motorcycle accident nine years previously. In the following July tournament, he again had a perfect 7–0 record, and after a playoff took the championship. In the playoff, he beat former makuuchi wrestler Masunoyama who was in his first full tournament back in sumo, after a series of injury leaves. The win against Masunoyama was shitatenage which would become Enho's signature move. For the following September tournament, Enhō was promoted to the sandanme division and once again took a perfect 7–0, this time winning a playoff versus Matsuda.

For the November tournament he was promoted to the makushita division. In this tournament Enhō was approaching an all time record for consecutive wins from entry into sumo.  However, in his first bout he lost to former komusubi Jōkōryū who himself holds the record for most consecutive wins upon entering sumo. Enhō ended the tournament with a 5–2 record. In the following January tournament, he was ranked at makushita 6 and achieved a 4–3 winning tournament. In most cases, at his rank with this record he would not have been promoted to the next division, the salaried ranks of jūryō. However, several jūryō wrestlers had records bad enough to be demoted from the division, and Enhō was promoted to fill one of the many open slots there. Not including makushita tsukedashi wrestlers, who are allowed to debut at a higher rank, this promotion meant Enhō tied the record for the fastest ever wrestler promoted to sekitori at six tournaments from his professional debut.

For this March 2018 tournament, Enhō was ranked at the bottom rung, at jūryō 14. As is often the case for a first timer in the salaried ranks, the wall was too high and he only managed a losing tournament record of 4–11 and was demoted back to makushita. After two strong performances of 5–2 in the upper ranks of makushita, Enhō was re-promoted to jūryō for the September tournament. In this tournament and the next two, he recorded three straight 9-6 records. In the following March tournament, he made the news after he came back from a near loss to Tokushōryū on day 9. Enhō's haunches came within 10 centimetres of the dohyō, before he bounced back, grabbing his opponent's legs with both hands and toppling him. This move called ashitori would also become one of his regular techniques. He ended this tournament with an 8–7.

This record was enough for Enhō to be promoted to the makuuchi top division for the May 2019 tournament, the first tournament of the Reiwa era. He was the only wrestler on the banzuke listed as being under . He won his first top division bout on the opening day, and earned his first kenshōkin or cash prize provided by a sponsor of the match. As it was Mother's Day, Enhō gave the prize money to his mother. He again garnered attention when on day 4, he took down Daishōhō, who was almost twice his size, with his now well-known shitatenage. However, after reaching the cusp of a winning tournament on his top division debut on day 9 with a 7–2 record, he then lost six bouts in a row and ended up with a losing tournament. His losing streak was exacerbated by a thigh injury he suffered on Day 13. However, Enhō's record was enough to leave him ranked in makuuchi for the following July tournament. In this tournament, he again had a similar situation of having seven wins this time on day 10. He lost three bouts in a row after this, but finally managed his first top division winning tournament with a win versus veteran Myōgiryū on day 14. He would end the tournament with a 9–6 record and was also awarded the technique prize. After another 9–6 record in September, he reached maegashira 6 in the November 2019 tournament.

In the January 2020 tournament, fighting at a career-high rank of maegashira 5, he defeated ōzeki Gōeidō on Day 9. Since accurate records began in 1975, he is believed to be only the third wrestler under 100 kilos to defeat an ōzeki, after Chiyonofuji (against Asahikuni in May 1978) and Mainoumi (against Takanohana in July 1994 and Takanonami in July 1995). He finished with an 8–7 record, failing to win the match on the final day that would have given him the Technique Prize.

The rest of 2020 proved to be challenging for Enhō, however, as he posted four consecutive make-koshi, closing out the year with a 3-12 score in the Kyūshū basho, resulting in his demotion to jūryō for the January 2021 tournament. He spoke of his disappointment at how 2020 had gone, saying he had been troubled by neck and wrist injuries and had not been able to do his own sumo. He said he was hoping to return to makuuchi in a single tournament, but after his stablemate Hakuhō tested positive for COVID-19, the whole of the Miyagino stable was forced to miss the January basho.

Enhō said in February that his fitness was "more or less back to where it was." He returned to competition in March 2021, and on Day 8 faced Ura, another popular wrestler known for his unusual techniques, for the first time since they competed in school. Ura won the match after a judges conference. Enhō finished the tournament with a 9–6 score, his first winning record since January 2020, but it was not enough to earn promotion back to makuuchi. In May, ranked at Jūryō 1 East, he produced a disappointing 5–10 record. In July he suffered a suspected concussion in his Day 2 match with Takagenji and was prevented by the judges from taking part in the rematch. He was forced to forfeit and was taken away in a wheelchair, in accordance with recently introduced protocols.

Enhō was withdrawn from the September 2021 tournament along with the rest of his stable after two wrestlers tested positive for COVID-19. It is the second time this year that the stable has had to withdraw from a basho because of a coronavirus outbreak.

After falling to a 6-9 record at Jūryō 10 in the January 2022 tournament, Enhō told reporters that he felt a sense of crisis and would have to restart his training from scratch.

Fighting style
Enhō is about  lighter and  shorter than the average for the top makuuchi division. Due to his small size he relies on speed and technique to outwit his opponents. He is known for coming in very low at the tachi-ai or initial charge and attempting to grab his opponent's mawashi with an inside left hand grip (hidari-yotsu). His favourite winning kimarite is shitatenage or underarm throw. In addition, more than a third of his wins come from either leg grabs or pulling underarm throw (shitatedashinage), when the average for a typical wrestler is just two percent. However his lack of weight means he can also easily be thrown, shoved or picked up and placed out of the ring, making his matches unpredictable and popular with audiences.

Career record

See also
Glossary of sumo terms
List of active sumo wrestlers
Active special prize winners

References

External links

1994 births
Living people
People from Kanazawa, Ishikawa
Japanese sumo wrestlers
Sumo people from Ishikawa Prefecture
20th-century Japanese people
21st-century Japanese people